The video game series based on the game show Family Feud began with ShareData's 1987 release on the Apple II and Commodore 64 consoles.  In 1990 GameTek released a version on the NES. GameTek later released four more Feud games for the Super NES, Sega Genesis, 3DO, and PC between 1993 and 1995.  Hasbro Interactive, Global Star, and Ubisoft have also released versions starting in 2000.

ShareData versions
ShareData released the first video game versions of the game show in 1987 on the Apple II and Commodore 64, with two versions of the packaging: one shows a drawing of a just completed round (using the Milton Bradley home game art design), and another shows a full shot of the set from the first Richard Dawson era. The game plays like the Dawson era (with the look similar to the 1976 - 1985 era) with (2 Single rounds, 1 Double Round, and 1 Triple Round - with 300 point rules and Fast Money Win of $10,000)

Later in 1989, ShareData released "The All New Family Feud" on PC, Apple, C64 with rules, gameplay and look based on the Ray Combs era.

GameTek versions gameplay

NES
In the NES version of Family Feud, the game tried to recreate the look and feel from the original Richard Dawson-hosted series, even going as far as to include a Dawson-like host who kissed the female characters in the game. (This differed from the game's packaging, which used the set from the Ray Combs era.) One or two players could play.

Just like the show, the object was to come up with answers to survey questions posed to 100 people. Correct answers were worth money, with $200 winning the game and the right to play Fast Money for $5,000, which was played exactly the same way as on the show (at least 200 points needed to win). $5 a point was awarded for unsuccessful playings of the round.

A player entered his answers by using the controller to scroll through the alphabet, contained in a string along the bottom of the screen; the answer had to be completed within a time limit. Reasonable similes to correct answers were accepted, and slight misspellings were also recognized.

Once a player won, they were given two options. The first was to stop playing, with the other being to continue on. A champion retired after winning over $20,000 automatically unless they were defeated.

If a computer-controlled family wins the game, no Fast Money is played with an excuse given to the form of "Due to (EXCUSE), the (NAMES) will not be playing Fast Money today". Excuses used include "tax considerations" and "a birth in the family". This is a carry-over from the ShareData versions of the game.

SNES/Genesis and 3DO/PC
The versions that followed used the Combs set, with the SNES and Genesis version using a host resembling Combs and the 3DO and PC versions featuring a host resembling Dawson (as he had returned to the series by this point).

The later versions also added options to where a player could play a game without facing an opponent and whether or not they wanted to play the Bullseye Round, which had been added to the show in 1992 and was included in each of the later releases. The Bullseye Round was played as it was during the last two seasons of the Combs Feud, where a $5,000 starting bank was used and up to $15,000 could be added depending on how many questions a team answered correctly.

The later version games played for points instead of dollars, with 300 winning the game. After a win, a player received a code to use if they wanted to stop playing but pick up where they left off. Five wins meant automatic retirement regardless of how much money a player won.

Next Generation reviewed the 3DO version of the game, rating it three stars out of five, and stated that "It's a blast if you have a bunch of folks with whom to play, however, in the final analysis, whether or not you like it probably depends on whether or not you like the television show."

Reviews
SNES:
Questicle.net (Dec, 2011)
All Game Guide (1998)
Game Freaks 365 (Nov 01, 2007)
The Game Hoard (Jun 30, 2020)
Just Games Retro (Dec 13, 2001)
NES Center (2001)
Genesis/SNES:
All Game Guide (1998)
Sega-16.com (Oct 08, 2006)
3DO:
The Video Game Critic (Jun 08, 2016)
Coming Soon Magazine (Jan, 1995)
3DO Magazine (UK) (Feb, 1995)

Hasbro, Global Star, and Ubisoft versions

In 2000, Family Feud was released for the PlayStation and PC by Hasbro Interactive. Louie Anderson, who was the host at the time, is the host of the game, appearing as a Full-motion video character. The game focuses on reliving the same aspect of the game show, in order to provide a better experience. The IBM PC version also features the ability to upload portraits of one's face, and placed in a three-dimensional animated body. This brought the whole experience closer, and it is often considered to be a good feature of the game.

The PC version would later be released in the United Kingdom in 2001 under the show's UK name Family Fortunes. The only differences between both is that Family Feud host Louie Anderson is replaced with then-Family Fortunes host Les Dennis, and the graphics have been changed to resemble the Family Fortunes set used at the time of the game's release.

In 2006, Global Star versions for the PlayStation 2, PC, and Game Boy Advance were made. Although the box art uses the 2006–2007 season's logo (the first time it was publicly seen before John O'Hurley was announced as host), the first set design in the game is the one from the 2005–2006 season (Richard Karn's final year). Other sets that can be unlocked are the original 1976–85, 1988–94, 1994–95, and 1999–2002.  Well-known game show host Todd Newton does the voiceover in addition to hosting the game.

In 2009, Ubisoft released Family Feud 2010 Edition for the Wii, Nintendo DS, and PC. The game uses the 2009 set and features customizable family avatars plus a predictive text input tool for faster answers. In a unique twist, the Wii version requires players to swing the Wii Remote down to hit the buzzer during Face-Offs. The game uses four-member families (much like the 1994–1995 season) as opposed to the usual five; like Ubisoft's Price Is Right video game, there is no host featured – all voiceover work is done by Terence McGovern.

In 2010, Ubisoft released Family Feud Decades for the Wii. The game uses sets and survey questions from the past four decades, using the 1976, 1988, 1999, and 2009 sets. Family Feud 2012 was released in 2011. In 2020, Ubisoft published a game simply called Family Feud, made by independent game studio, Snap Finger Click, for PlayStation 4, Xbox One, Nintendo Switch, and Stadia.

Reviews
Hasbro:
IGN (Oct 30, 2000)
PSX Nation (Jan 18, 2001)
All Game Guide (2000)
IGN (Dec 01, 2000)
Global Star:
IGN (Nov 02, 2006)
Ubisoft:
Game industry News (GiN) (Dec 02, 2009)
GameZone (Oct 18, 2009)
gamrReview (Dec 01, 2009)
Digital Chumps (Oct 14, 2009)
IGN (Jul 07, 2010)

Other games

Seattle-based Mobliss Inc. also released a mobile version of Family Feud that was available on Sprint, Verizon, and Cingular.

In October 2008, Glu Mobile released a mobile video game version of Family Feud.

References

External links
Family Feud at Eurocom

1987 video games
3DO Interactive Multiplayer games
Apple II games
Commodore 64 games
Eurocom games
Family Feud
Game Boy Advance games
GameTek games
Mobile games
Nintendo DS games
Nintendo Entertainment System games
Nintendo Switch games
PlayStation (console) games
PlayStation 2 games
PlayStation Network games
Sega Genesis games
Stadia games
Super Nintendo Entertainment System games
Video games based on game shows
Video games developed in the United States
Wii games
Windows games

fr:Family Feud